Henri Prost  (February 25, 1874 – July 16, 1959) was a French architect and urban planner. He was noted in particularly for his work in Morocco and Turkey, where he created a number of comprehensive city plans for Casablanca, Fes, Marrakesh, Meknes, Rabat, and Istanbul, including transportation infrastructure and avenues with buildings, plazas, squares, promenades and parks.

Early years
Born in Saint-Denis, a northern suburb of Paris, Henri Prost studied architecture at the École Spéciale d'Architecture and at the École des Beaux-Arts. Among his teachers was Marcel Lambert, who surveyed the Acropolis in Athens. In 1902, he was awarded prestigious Prix de Rome scholarship and was able to travel in Italy and Europe to study the architectural landmarks.

Morocco 

In 1913, Hubert Lyautey, the military governor of the French Morocco invited Prost to work on development of major Moroccan cities: Fes, Marrakesh, Meknes, Rabat and Casablanca. Prost stayed in Morocco for a decade, and soon Casablanca was lauded as a success story of an application of the principles of urbanism.

France 
Back to France, Prost worked in 1923-1924 as a regional planner, developing a series of comprehensive urban plans for Côte Varoise in Western French Riviera. In 1932, he was invited to direct the regional urban studies of the Paris metropolitan area. The Plan d'Aménagement de la Région Parisienne that was developed under his tutelage was  approved in 1939.

Istanbul's redevelopment
Starting from 1924, Prost was consulting the government of Turkey on an irregular basis. In 1936, Prost was invited to Turkey by Mustafa Kemal Atatürk to develop a grand plan of Istanbul's redevelopment, and he stayed there for fifteen years. He became the head of the city's Planning Office and authored the master-plan of its architectural future. Modernization and conservation were laid at its core. Later in 1947, Prost explained his approach in such words: 

After deciding to make drastic cuts through the network of historic Istanbul's neighborhoods with transportation corridors, broad avenues and pedestrian promenades, parks and monumental squares, Prost also started to work on preserving the remaining major historical monuments of Istanbul, including Roman-Byzantine, as well as Ottoman landmarks, and making them accessible to public. After his plea, Atatürk approved the transformation of Hagia Sophia, which served as the Grand Mosque of Istanbul, into a museum.

However, after all was said and done, it turned out that Prost's master-plan imposed a heavy interventionist burden on historical structure of the city. It was criticized by Le Corbusier in 1948, who previously wrote a letter to Atatürk, advising him to conserve the city without even disturbing its historic dust. Among Prost's decisions considered controversial today, the demolition of the historic Taksim Military Barracks can be cited.

Accomplishments
Henri Prost along with Tony Garnier, Léon Jausseley, and Ernest Hébrard is considered as a pioneer of the French urbanism. His ideas and architectural plans were representative of the first generation of French urbanists with all their achievements and limitations. In 1902, Prost made a design drawing of a national printing office in Italy and was subsequently awarded with the Prix de Rome scholarship. His plans for the restoration of the Hagia Sophia in Constantinople received a medal at the Salon des Artistes Français in 1912. Prost was the co-founder in 1911 of the Société française des urbanistes (SFU) with architects Donat Alfred Agache, Mr. Auburtin, A. Bérard, Eugène Hénard (Architect of the City of Paris), Léon Jaussely, A. Parenty, engineer Jean Claude Nicolas Forestier and the landscape architect Edouard Redont. He became a member of the Central Society of Architects in 1930. He was elected member of the Academy of Fine Arts in 1933. He served as Director of the Special School of Architecture from 1929 to 1959.

References

Further reading
 Çelik, Z. (1993). The Remaking of Istanbul: Portrait of an Ottoman City in the Nineteenth Century. Berkeley: Univ. of California Press.
 Frey, J.-P. Parcours d'un urbaniste discret (Rabat, Paris, Istanbul...). Urbanisme, no. 336, (2004): 79.
 Gül, Murat. (2009). The Emergence of Modern Istanbul: Transformation and Modernisation of a City. New York: I. B. Tauris and Palgrave Macmillan.
 Kafescioğlu, Çiğdem. (2009). Constantinopolis/Istanbul: Cultural encounter, imperial vision, and the construction of the Ottoman capital. University Park, Pa: Pennsylvania State University Press.
 Wright, Gwendolyn. (1991). The Politics of Design in French Colonial Urbanism. Chicago: University of Chicago Press.

External links

 ArchiWebture — Prost, Henri (1874-1959).

20th-century French architects
French urban planners
Prix de Rome for architecture
1874 births
1959 deaths
Architects from Paris
École Spéciale d'Architecture alumni
École des Beaux-Arts alumni